Soma is the second album of the Brazilian instrumental music group Mallavoodoo. It was produced by the bass player, Thales Silveira and released in 2006. This recording was financed by Recife city hall and took three months to get finished.

It was positively criticized by some Brazilian musical magazines, such as Cover Baixo and Teclado e Áudio.

Track listing

Personnel
Thales Silveira: electric bass, acoustic bass
Mário Lobo: keyboards, saxophone
Alexandre Bicudo: electric guitar, acoustic guitar
Misael Barros: drums, percussion

References

2006 albums
Mallavoodoo albums